Campbell Lake may refer to:
 Campbell Lake, a lake in Anchorage, Alaska
 Campbell Lake (Carver and McLeod counties, Minnesota) 
 Campbell Lake, a lake in Scott County, Minnesota
 Campbell Lake, a lake on Vancouver Island, Canada

See also
Kincaid Park, home to Little Campbell Lake in Anchorage, Alaska